Holzdorf Air Base  is a military airfield operated by the German Air Force (Luftwaffe). It is also known as Schönewalde/Holzdorf Air Base, as most of the base is situated east of the Saxony-Anhalt/Brandenburg border, in the city of Schönewalde. The air base is home to the air forces's Helicopter Wing 64.

In 1968 the site was selected by the Air Forces of the National People's Army for a new airbase. The airbase was completed in 1974 and expanded into an operational airfield by 1980. The handover to the NVA's Jagdfliegergeschwader 1 took place at the beginning of November 1982, when it was relocated from Cottbus-Nord Airport to Holzdorf.

Support Squadron 1 of the German Army Aviation Corps was formerly located at Holzdorf.  It was dissolved in 2013 as part of the reorganization/reduction of the Bundeswehr announced in October 2011.

References

External links
 . Military AIP Germany.
 ETSH Procedures. Military AIP Germany.
 
 

Bases of the German Air Force
Buildings and structures in Saxony-Anhalt
Elbe-Elster Land
Airports in Brandenburg
Airports in Saxony-Anhalt